Dömez can refer to:

 Dömez, İnegöl
 Dömez, Söğüt
 Domez (Spain)es, a village in Spain